Ramblewood is an unincorporated community and census-designated place (CDP) located within Mount Laurel Township in Burlington County, New Jersey, United States. As of the 2010 United States Census, the CDP's population was 5,907.

Geography
According to the United States Census Bureau, the CDP had a total area of 3.386 square miles (8.769 km2), including 3.372 square miles (8.732 km2) of land and 0.014 square miles (0.037 km2) of water (0.42%).

Demographics

Census 2010

Census 2000
As of the 2000 United States Census there were 6,003 people, 2,306 households, and 1,568 families living in the CDP. The population density was 683.7/km2 (1,771.8/mi2). There were 2,379 housing units at an average density of 271.0/km2 (702.2/mi2). The racial makeup of the CDP was 90.05% White, 4.78% African American, 0.05% Native American, 3.48% Asian, 0.48% from other races, and 1.15% from two or more races. Hispanic or Latino of any race were 2.03% of the population.

There were 2,306 households, out of which 29.6% had children under the age of 18 living with them, 58.6% were married couples living together, 7.1% had a female householder with no husband present, and 32.0% were non-families. 26.5% of all households were made up of individuals, and 6.7% had someone living alone who was 65 years of age or older. The average household size was 2.51 and the average family size was 3.10.

In the CDP the population was spread out, with 22.0% under the age of 18, 5.7% from 18 to 24, 30.4% from 25 to 44, 26.1% from 45 to 64, and 15.9% who were 65 years of age or older. The median age was 40 years. For every 100 females, there were 93.5 males. For every 100 females age 18 and over, there were 91.8 males.

The median income for a household in the CDP was $71,230, and the median income for a family was $76,519. Males had a median income of $57,152 versus $36,436 for females. The per capita income for the CDP was $30,308. About 1.1% of families and 1.7% of the population were below the poverty line, including 2.8% of those under age 18 and none of those age 65 or over.

References

Mount Laurel, New Jersey
Census-designated places in Burlington County, New Jersey